Harry Edwin Moran (April 2, 1889 – November 28, 1962) was a Major League Baseball pitcher. He started playing professional baseball on June 23, 1912 with the Detroit Tigers.

References

External links

Major League Baseball pitchers
Detroit Tigers players
Buffalo Buffeds players
Newark Peppers players
Providence Grays (minor league) players
Louisville Colonels (minor league) players
Washington and Lee Generals baseball players
Milwaukee Brewers (minor league) players
Baseball players from West Virginia
1889 births
1962 deaths
Sportspeople from Beckley, West Virginia